Caden Thomas Tomy (born 12 September 2001) is a Canadian professional soccer player.

Early life
Tomy began playing youth soccer at age five with Winnipeg South End United SC, where he played for four years. Afterwards, he joined WSA Winnipeg, including being able to train with their Premier Development League squad when he turned 15. He later played for WSA Winnipeg at the senior amateur level in the Manitoba Major Soccer League. In 2018, Tomy attended the Canadian Premier League Open Trials, being invited back for the second day of trials.

Club career
In June 2021, Tomy trialed in pre-season with local Canadian Premier League side Valour FC. In September 2021, Tomy signed his first professional contract with Valour. After his contract expired after the season, he returned to trial with the club in their 2022 pre-season.

In August 2022, he went on trial with Spanish club SD Huesca B of the Tercera Federación.

References

External links

Living people
Association football midfielders
Canadian soccer players
Soccer players from Winnipeg
Valour FC players
Canadian Premier League players
2001 births